Their Worldly Goods is a 1914 American silent short film directed by Sydney Ayres. Starring  William Garwood, Edith Borella, Charlotte Burton, Jack Richardson, Louise Lester,  Vivian Rich and Harry Van Meter.

References

External links

1914 films
1914 drama films
Silent American drama films
American silent short films
American black-and-white films
1914 short films
Films directed by Sydney Ayres
1910s American films